New Harmony is an unincorporated community located near U.S. Route 78 in Union County, Mississippi.

References

Unincorporated communities in Union County, Mississippi
Unincorporated communities in Mississippi